The 1992 African Cup Winners' Cup football club tournament was won by Africa Sports in two-legged final victory against Vital'O FC. This was the eighteenth season that the tournament took place for the winners of each African country's domestic cup. Thirty-eight sides entered the competition, with Chief Santos withdrawing before the 1st leg of the preliminary round and Highlanders F.C. withdrawing before the 1st leg of the first round.

Preliminary round

|}

First round

|}

Second round

|}

Quarter-finals

|}

Semi-finals

|}

Final

|}

Champions

External links
 Results available on CAF Official Website
 Results available on RSSSF

African Cup Winners' Cup
2